Mathilde Uldall Kramer (born 15 March 1993) is a Danish athlete. She competed in the women's 60 metres at the 2018 IAAF World Indoor Championships.

References

External links

1993 births
Living people
Danish female sprinters
Place of birth missing (living people)
Athletes (track and field) at the 2020 Summer Olympics
Olympic athletes of Denmark